Carolyn Murphy (born August 11, 1974) is an American model and actress.

Career
In 1998, Murphy was named VH1/Vogues Model of the Year. She played Dubbie in Barry Levinson's film Liberty Heights. She was one of the 'Modern Muses' on the November 1999 millennium cover of American Vogue and was chosen to represent Calvin Klein's perfume, Contradiction. She was featured on the cover of the Sports Illustrated Swimsuit Issue in 2005 and 2006.

Murphy has shot campaigns for Missoni, Versace and Tiffany & Co.

In July 2012, Murphy was hired to replace Angela Lindvall as host of Project Runway All Stars on Lifetime, after Rosie Huntington-Whiteley dropped out for a film project. In 2012, Murphy was ninth on the Forbes top-earning models list, estimated to have earned $3.5 million in one year.

Personal life
As of 2015, Murphy and boyfriend Lincoln Pilcher, practice Transcendental Meditation.

References

1974 births
Living people
Female models from Florida
Choctawhatchee High School alumni
IMG Models models
Participants in American reality television series
People from Panama City, Florida
21st-century American women